William Harold Fishman (March 2, 1914 – January 25, 2001) was a Canadian-American cancer researcher who taught at Tufts University from 1948 until his retirement in 1975. In 1976, with a $180,000 grant from the National Cancer Institute, he co-founded the La Jolla Cancer Research Foundation (since renamed the Sanford Burnham Prebys Medical Discovery Institute) with his wife, Lillian. He was also the founding editor-in-chief of Tumor Biology, serving in this role from 1980 to 1983.

References

1914 births
2001 deaths
Cancer researchers
People from Winnipeg
University of Saskatchewan alumni
University of Toronto alumni
Tufts University faculty
Canadian biochemists
American biochemists
University of Chicago faculty
Medical journal editors
Canadian emigrants to the United States